Burg Bruck is a medieval castle in Lienz in Tyrol, Austria.

It was completed in 1278 as the residence of the Meinhardiner Counts of Görz. In 1490 the chapel was decorated with frescoes by Simon von Taisten. In 1500 the last count Leonhard of Görz bequeathed the castle to the Habsburg archduke Maximilian I of Austria, who incorporated it into his Tyrolean possessions. During the Campaigns of 1796 in the French Revolutionary Wars it was occupied by French troops under General Barthélemy Catherine Joubert. Today Bruck Castle is a museum featuring many works of the painter Albin Egger-Lienz.

See also
List of castles in Austria

References
This article was initially translated from the German Wikipedia.

External links
 Museum der Stadt Lienz Schloss Bruck (German)

Castles in Tyrol (state)
Museums in Tyrol (state)
Art museums and galleries in Austria